Luiz Carlos Marques Lima (born 30 May 1989), commonly known as Thiago Alagoano, is a Brazilian professional footballer who plays as a forward for Criciúma.

Club career 
In August 2014, Alagoano joined South Korean club Jeju United.

References

External links 
 
 

1989 births
Living people
Sportspeople from Alagoas
Brazilian footballers
Association football forwards
Agremiação Sportiva Arapiraquense players
Américo Esporte Clube players
Horizonte Futebol Clube players
Associação Cultural Esporte Clube Baraúnas players
Esporte Clube Jacuipense players
Jeju United FC players
Associação Atlética Coruripe players
Colo Colo de Futebol e Regatas players
Esporte Clube Cruzeiro players
River Atlético Clube players
Joinville Esporte Clube players
Esporte Clube São Luiz players
Brusque Futebol Clube players
Campeonato Brasileiro Série C players
Campeonato Brasileiro Série B players
K League 1 players
Campeonato Brasileiro Série D players
Brazilian expatriate footballers
Brazilian expatriate sportspeople in South Korea
Expatriate footballers in South Korea